Monte Barro is a mountain of Lombardy, Italy, It has an elevation of .

References

Mountains of the Alps
Mountains of Lombardy